Shivam Khurana (born 24 February 1991) is an Indian cricketer. He made his first-class debut for Uttarakhand in the 2018–19 Ranji Trophy on 1 November 2018. He made his Twenty20 debut for Uttarakhand in the 2018–19 Syed Mushtaq Ali Trophy on 21 February 2019.

References

External links
 

1991 births
Living people
Indian cricketers
Uttarakhand cricketers
Place of birth missing (living people)
Wicket-keepers